Glenea atricornis is a species of beetle in the family Cerambycidae. It was described by Maurice Pic in 1943.

References

atricornis
Beetles described in 1943